Pablo Garza may refer to:
 Pablo González Garza (1879–1950), Mexican general
Pablo Garza (fighter) (born 1983), American mixed martial arts fighter